Surgad (.lit “Gods Fort”), is a hill fort located in a spur, fragmented from the Sahyadri ranges of Maharashtra. The fort is situated near Roha, next to the village of Vaijanath in the Raigad district. This fort was an observation fort, which guarded the trade route along the Kundalika river from Sudhagad to Revdanda fort.

History
This fort is believed to be built by Shilahar kings and subsequently used by the Nizam of Ahmednagar. The great Maratha king Chhatrapati Shivaji is also believed to have reconstructed this fort. During the Rajaram's regime this fort was captured by Shankarji Narayan Sachiv from the Siddhi of Janjira. In 1733 again this fort was captured by Senior Bajirao I. During Peshwa period this fort was used to keep prisoners. There is a block of stone with inscriptions in Farsi (Persian) and Devnagari. The inscription records that the fort was built in the beginning of the second year of the command of Sidhi saheb. The architect was Nuryaji and the Governor of the fort was Tukoji Haibat. It seems that the fort was built at times when use of artillery was not known in battle.  In the Third Anglo-Maratha War, along with other forts in the neighboring region.this fort was won over by Colonel Prother from the Peshwas in February 1818.

How to reach

The nearest railway station is Kolad. The nearest bus stop is at the village Khamb which is on the Mumbai-Goa national highway (NH-17). There is a road from village Khamb to Surgad fort. The distance is about 4 km. It passes through village Vaijanath. The fort is accessible from the Northern side as well as western side. It takes about 1 hour to reach the top of the fort. The path passes through wooded forest. It is suggested to hire a guide from the Surgad during rainy season. There is a small rock patch on the western path. Most of the buildings on the fort are in ruined state. The fort is covered by tall grass during September–November.  From atop the fort there are views of the Kundalika river.

Places to visit

The fort is like a small spur running south from the main hill range. There are 17 rock cut cisterns on the fort. However, the water from the cistern which is on the North-Eastern side is potable.  A small temple of the Veer Maruti  is also situated atop. The main gate is not in good condition. There is one cannon on the plateau at the base of the fort. There are two good bastions, one at the northern end and the other at the southern end. There are two dilapidated buildings on the fort namely Sadar and daru-kothar. There is a temple of Ansai Devi near the base of the fort.

There is a dense teak and Dhawda forest around the entire fort.

See also
List of forts in Maharashtra
Roha

Gallery

References

Forts in Raigad district
16th-century forts in India
Buildings and structures of the Maratha Empire